Mark Alan Lowry (born June 24, 1958) is an American singer, comedian, minister and songwriter. He is best known for co-writing the song "Mary, Did You Know?" and being a member of the Gaither Vocal Band from 1988 to 2001, and 2009 to 2013, along with Michael English, Guy Penrod, David Phelps and Bill Gaither. Lowry has recorded twelve albums, both music and comedy.

Early life
Lowry was born in Houston, Texas, to Charles, an attorney, and Beverly Lowry. He often uses anecdotes of his young life in his comedy, as well as speaking of his experience with hyperactivity and attention deficit disorder in his performances. He is a self-described "Poster Boy for Hyperactivity".

Early career
While attending Liberty Baptist College (now known as Liberty University), Lowry joined a college evangelistic team made of Charles Hughes and David Musselman and began singing. 

In 1978, Lowry was badly injured in a car accident near Carlisle, Pennsylvania, while touring with his college evangelistic team. He sustained eleven broken bones, and spent a good deal of time in physical therapy recovering from the accident. 

After graduating from college, Lowry began singing in Baptist churches professionally. His comedy career inadvertently began from here. There would be an elongated pause in his singing performance while he waited for the soundtrack to be changed. Lowry began to fill this pause with a monologue. He soon realized that the audiences at his performances were laughing not at him but at his monologues.

"Mary, Did You Know?"
In 1984, Lowry wrote the lyrics to the song "Mary, Did You Know?", when asked to write a script for a church Christmas play. He wrote a series of questions that he would like to ask Mary, the mother of Jesus. These questions were used in between the scenes of the play. Over the next decade, Lowry tried to find music that would complete the song. Eventually, musician and songwriter Buddy Greene wrote the music to the song. The Christmas play script then became the song.

The song has become a popular Christmas song performed by more than thirty artists including Cee Lo Green, Clay Aiken, Kenny Rogers, Wynonna Judd, Michael English, Daniel Childs, Natalie Cole, Pippa Wilson, Kathy Mattea, Michael Crawford, Zara Larsson, Peter Hollens, Marnell Tanner, Dolly Parton, and Pentatonix. In 2016, Lowry himself sang it, backed by the a cappella group, Voctave.

The lyrics have been criticised for perceived ambiguity or lack of scriptural or theological depth. Baptist theologian Michael Frost suggests it is the "most sexist Christmas song ever written... It treats her like a clueless child... Could you imagine a song asking Abraham 17 times if he knew he'd be the father of a great nation?"

The Gaither Vocal Band

In 1988, Lowry was approached by Bill Gaither and asked to join the Gaither Vocal Band as the baritone.  Lowry's career with the band spanned thirteen years during his first stint with the group. His on-stage antics were popular with audiences. As a result, he became the co-host of the many concerts and shows performed by Gaither and the Vocal Band, with Gaither playing the straight man to Lowry's antics.

In June 2001, Lowry resigned from the Gaither Vocal Band after performing longer with the group than any previous member except Gaither himself. After that, Lowry released several solo albums, including I Love to Tell the Story, A Hymns Collection.

On January 14, 2009, it was announced that Lowry would be returning to the Gaither Vocal Band while maintaining his solo career. In October 2013, it was announced that Lowry and Michael English would be leaving the group to devote more time to their solo careers. Lowry stayed on through the end of the year.

Videos
Lowry's first video was Mark Lowry: My First Comedy Video made in 1988. Next, he made Mark Lowry: The Last Word in 1992 at the Tivoli Theatre in Chattanooga, Tennessee. He taped Mark Lowry: Mouth in Motion in 1993 at Carpenter's Home Church in Lakeland, Florida. The album won a Dove Award for Long Form Music Video of the Year at the 25th GMA Dove Awards in 1994. He made Mark Lowry: Remotely Controlled in 1995. Mark Lowry on Broadway was performed and captured to DVD at the Beacon Theatre in NYC in 2000, and Mark Lowry Goes to Hollywood was performed and captured to DVD at the Cerritos Center in Cerritos, California, in January 2005.

Current projects
Lowry continues to tour the United States performing his music and comedy concerts as well as recording music and comedy CD albums and videos. He records and publishes several podcasts, including Saturdays with Mark and Tony, a weekly podcast with Tony Campolo. He co-hosts Bill Gaither's Homecoming Radio with Bill Gaither and Phil Brower. Starting in March 2011, he has been a frequent co-host of the Red Letter Christians TV show with Campolo.

Lowry has streamed live almost every day on his YouTube channel since the start of the COVID-19 pandemic. He livestreams "Just Whenever" several times a week, if not daily, and hosts "First Mondays with Mark" on the first Monday of each month, joined by his friends Coleen and Phillip.

Family
Lowry is single. He has a brother, sister, three nieces and three nephews.

References

External links
 The "ReMARKable" Site – MarkLowry.com, Lowry's official website
 Gaither.com – home of Gaither records and the Gaither Vocal Band

1958 births
Living people
20th-century American comedians
20th-century American singers
20th-century Christians
21st-century American comedians
21st-century American singers
21st-century Christians
American comedy musicians
American male comedians
American baritones
American performers of Christian music
Liberty University alumni
People from Houston
Southern gospel performers
20th-century American male singers
21st-century American male singers